Automobiles Sans Soupapes (ASS) (English: Automobiles Without Valves) was a French automobile manufacturer founded in 1919 by Bernard Verdy in Lyon, France. The company merged with Société des Moteurs Thomas in March 1920.

Vehicle
Automobiles Sans Soupapes marketed their vehicle under the abbreviated name ASS and advertised it as L'automobile pour tous (The automobile for everyone), The car was powered by a 1240cc,  two-stroke Thomas engine and used a 2-speed epicyclic transmission. The car featured electric lights and starter. The vehicle was launched in March 1919 available in 4-door tourer and 2-door coupe variants at a cost of 4750 francs. Plans for mass production went unrealized, and in March 1920 it was announced that the company had merged with Société des Moteurs Thomas.

References

Automobile Sans Soupapes on the German Wikipedia

Vintage vehicles
Defunct motor vehicle manufacturers of France
Manufacturing companies based in Lyon